Willamette, from the Clackamas language of the Columbia River, Oregon, can refer to:

A toponym of the U.S. state of Oregon:
 Willamette River, a tributary of the Columbia River in northwestern Oregon 
 Willamette Valley, a region in northwest Oregon that surrounds the Willamette River
 Willamette Valley AVA, Oregon wine region
 Willamette Valley (ecoregion), an area that includes the Willamette Valley and adjacent parts of Washington
 Willamette, Oregon, an unincorporated community that is now part of West Linn
 Willamette National Forest, a National Forest in western Oregon
 Willamette Falls, a natural waterfall on the Willamette River between Oregon City and West Linn 
 Willamette Meteorite, a meteorite that was discovered in Oregon 
 Willamette Pass Resort, a ski area in the Cascade Range of Oregon 
 Willamette Stone, survey marker in Oregon
 Willamette Cattle Company, a company formed in Oregon in 1837 to buy cattle in California
 Willamette University, a private institution of higher learning located in Salem
 Willamette Hall, a building on the University of Oregon campus
 Willamette High School, a high school in Eugene
 Willamette Trading Post, a 19th-century fur trading post

Other
 Willamette Industries, a former Fortune 500 company purchased by Weyerhauser
 Willamette locomotive, a type of steam locomotive formerly used in the logging and mining industries
 Willamette, the code-name for the first core used in the Intel Pentium 4 microprocessor
 Willamette, Colorado, a fictional setting in the video game Dead Rising
 , several United States Navy ships
 Willamette, American steamer
 Willamette Hops, used in the brewing of beer, see List of hop varieties

See also
Wilmette, Illinois